Duke Chu may refer to:

Duke Chu of Wey (died  469 BC)
Duke Chu of Jin (died after 452 BC)
Duke Chu of Qin
Chuzi I ( 708–698 BC), reigned 703–698 BC
Chuzi II ( 388–385 BC), reigned 386–385 BC